Kavari Maan is a 1979 Indian Tamil-language film, directed by  S. P. Muthuraman and written by Panchu Arunachalam. The film stars Sivaji Ganesan, with Vijayakumar, Ravichandran, Sekhar and Sridevi in supporting roles. It was released on 6 April 1979.

Plot 

Thyagarajan is an IAS officer. After seeing his wife Kalpana in bed with her extramarital lover Anand, he murders her in front of his daughter Uma's eyes. This strains his relationship with his daughter, who remains contemptuous towards him even after he completes his prison term. He however keeps coming behind her as she is the only solace he has in life. His family too has disowned him except for Sivaramakrishan, his father, who was a judge and has read the character of Thyagarajan, Kalpana and understood what would have happened.

As fate would have it, Uma is love with Rajesh, a womaniser. In spite of numerous attempts by Thyagarajan, Uma refuses to believe that Rajesh is bad. On his birthday party, Rajesh attempts to rape her and she kills him. Thyagarajan goes to prison taking the blame and the family which already hated him now refuses to acknowledge him with Uma and Sivaramakrishnan alone still being with him.

Cast 

Male cast
Sivaji Ganesan as Thyagarajan
Vijayakumar as Sundarrajan
Ravichandran as Anand
Sekhar as Rajesh
Major Sundarrajan as Rangarajan
Thengai Srinivasan as Vasu
Calcutta Viswanathan as Sivaramakrishnan

Female cast
Sridevi as Uma
Prameela as Kalpana
S. Varalakshmi as Rajalakshmi

Manimala as Leela
Baby Babitha as young Uma

Soundtrack 
The music was composed by Ilaiyaraaja, with lyrics by Panchu Arunachalam. The song "Brova Bharama" is set in the Carnatic raga Bahudari.

Release and reception 
Kavari Maan was released on 6 April 1979. Though fans were unwilling to accept Ganesan portraying a wife killer, the film emerged a commercial success. Kaushikan of Kalki criticised the story but praised Muthuraman's direction, adding that the deer in the film's title was not leaping, but roaring.

Notes

References

External links 
 

1970s Tamil-language films
1979 films
Films directed by S. P. Muthuraman
Films scored by Ilaiyaraaja
Films with screenplays by Panchu Arunachalam
Uxoricide in fiction